Lagunillas Municipality may refer to:
 Lagunillas Municipality, Bolivia, Bolivia
 Lagunillas Municipality, Michoacán, Mexico
 Lagunillas Municipality, San Luis Potosí, Mexico
 Lagunillas Municipality, Zulia, Venezuela

Municipality name disambiguation pages